Polygonum glabrum can refer to:

Polygonum glabrum Rchb., a synonym of Persicaria lapathifolia (L.) Delarbre
Polygonum glabrum Roxb., a synonym of Persicaria decipiens (R.Br.) K.L.Wilson
Polygonum glabrum Roxb. ex D.Don, a synonym of Persicaria decipiens (R.Br.) K.L.Wilson
Polygonum glabrum Willd., a synonym of Persicaria glabra (Willd.) M.Gómez